The Class 81 is the first and oldest type of electric multiple unit introduced by Keretapi Tanah Melayu for its KTM Komuter service. 18 sets were designed by Hunslet TPL and built by Ganz Works in 1993-1994.

The Class 81 currently operates in a fixed 3-car formation for its regular service. The middle coach is exclusively for women and children.

The KTM Class 81 design is derived from the British Rail Class 323, with the main alteration being that it has single leaf swing-plug doors instead of a double leaf type.

Description
The EMUs were built from 1993 to 1994 and entered service on 3 August 1995. The EMUs were the first electric trains of any kind in KTM's history. They operate in multiple-unit formation, The EMUs were state-of-the-art, with remote-controlled pneumatic doors, Automatic Train Protection (ATP), train data recorder, wheel-slip control, GTO/IGBT traction electronics and regenerative braking, and ran from  overhead catenary supply. Up to the point of their introduction no other KTM motive power used these modern train control systems.

The train runs in a 3-car formation. They were once run in 3+3 formations during rush hour, but this configuration was discontinued.

The cessation of Jenbacher’s rail operations resulted in loss of spare parts for these trains. Over the years, their maintenance lapsed, resulting in poor reliability and premature failure. As a result, some had to be used as dummy coaches in a hybrid service. A diesel locomotive pulled the coaches and a power generator was attached at the end. The hybrid service started in 2009 and ended in 2012, when new trains rendered this stopgap measure unnecessary.

Many trains were rendered surplus after the introduction of the Class 92 in 2012. Some were brought down to be converted to intercity sets, while others were scrapped. The refurbished sets could not be used as intercity sets in the end as regulations mandate that long distance trains have a toilet, which this class lacks.

The class disappeared from passenger service from 2012 to 2018. However, in 2018, many of the refurbished EMUs were brought back into service. They currently operate on the Batu Caves shuttle, the Northern Sector and occasionally the Central sector.

Gallery

References

KTM Komuter
Multiple units of Malaysia
Train-related introductions in 1995
25 kV AC multiple units
Ganz-Mavag multiple units